The 1969 Islington North by-election was a parliamentary by-election held  on 30 October 1969 for the House of Commons constituency of Islington North in Islington, north London.

The seat had become vacant when the constituency's Labour Member of Parliament (MP), Gerry Reynolds had died on 7 June 1969, aged 42. He had held the seat since a by-election in 1958 following the death of his predecessor, Wilfred Fienburgh.

The result of the contest was a victory for the Labour Party candidate, Michael O'Halloran, who won with a majority of 1,534 votes over the Conservative candidate Andrew Pearce.

References

See also
Islington North (UK Parliament constituency)
Islington
1937 Islington North by-election
1958 Islington North by-election
List of United Kingdom by-elections

Islington North,1969
Islington North by-election
Islington North,1969
Islington North by-election
Islington North by-election